was a Japanese master of judo who achieved the rank of Kōdōkan  9th Dan. He led the development of judo in France.

Biography
Shozo Awazu was born in Kyoto in 1923. He came in France in 1950 and assisted Mikinosuke Kawaishi in introducing judo in France.

He was the teacher of Henri Courtine and Bernard Pariset. From 1953 to 2014, he was professor of judo at the Racing Club de France in Paris.

Awazu was considered to be one of the top experts in ne waza (grappling techniques), kata and tandoku-renshu.

Bibliography
 Shozo Awazu, 1963. Méthode de judo au sol. Editions Publi-Judo, Paris. Reprinted Chiron-Sports, Paris, 1974. 
 Emmanuel Charlot, 2004. L'esprit du judo. Awazu : l'exemple. Judo magazine, n° 216, Paris, p. 60-63.

Filmography
 Camille de Casabianca, Tatami, 2003.

References

1923 births
2016 deaths
Japanese male judoka
Judo in France
Martial arts in France
People from Kyoto
Japanese expatriates in France